Republican Front was a Catalan left-wing and republicanist electoral alliance formed for the April 2019 Spanish general election by Free People, We Are Alternative and Pirates of Catalonia and the support of La Forja.

History
The coalition was presented on March 15, 2019 at the headquarters of the "Escarré International Center for Ethnic and National Minorities" (CIEMEN) and included Free People, We Are Alternative and Pirates of Catalonia. It was presented in the 2019 Spanish general election and was led by Albano Dante Fachin, Maribel Rodríguez, Guillem Fuster, Mireia Caldés and Roger Español.

The coalition fielded candidates in all four Catalan constituencies in the election. It won 113,807 votes, 2.8% of the total vote in Catalonia, placing eighth overall. However, the coalition fell below the 3% electoral threshold in all but one constituency (Girona), and failed to elect any deputies.

On May 15, 2019 the three constituent parties of the Republican Front decided to dissolve the coalition. Poble Lliure and the Pirates have both endorsed the candidacy of Popular Unity Candidacy (Catalan: Candidatura d'Unitat Popular, CUP) for the November 2019 election.

Composition

Electoral results

Cortes Generales

References

External links
 Front Republicà

2019 establishments in Catalonia
2019 disestablishments in Catalonia
Defunct political party alliances in Spain
Political parties established in 2019
Political parties disestablished in 2019
Socialist parties in Catalonia